Krasnaya Ulka (Uləẑye Ptlyź) is a rural locality (a khutor) and the administrative center of Krasnoulskoye Rural Settlement of Maykopsky District, Russia. The population was 401 as of 2018. There are 6 streets.

Geography 
Krasnaya Ulka is located 28 km north of Tulsky (the district's administrative centre) by road. Volny is the nearest rural locality.

References 

Rural localities in Maykopsky District